Georgios Simos (born 29 March 1978) is a Greek professional football manager and former player, who is the current manager of Super League 2 club Athens Kallithea.

Playing career
Born in Ioannina, Simos came through the ranks at Panathinaikos, before being promoted to the senior team in 1999. He later played for Agios Nikolaos, OFI, Chalkidona, AEL, AEK Larnaca, Ionikos, Panetolikos, Ethnikos Piraeus, Kallithea and Rouf.

Managerial career
Simos holds a holds the UEFA Pro Licence.

Early career

In August 2012, Simos returned to Panathinaikos to begin his coaching career, quickly rising through the academy to lead the Under-15, Under-17, and Under-20 teams in successive seasons from 2013/14 through 2015/16. After spending a part of the 2016/17 season as an assistant coach at Cypriot top flight club Omonia, Simos took on the AEK Athens Under-20 team for one-and-a-half seasons to February 2019.

OFI Crete

On 12 July 2019, Simos was named manager of OFI Crete following the departure of Jaime Vera. In his debut season, Simos would guide OFI to a sixth-place finish in Super League 1 and their first qualification for the UEFA Europa League in 20 years. In the 2020–21 UEFA Europa League, OFI would be eliminated by Apollon Limassol in the second qualifying round. Simos would resign from his position as manager prior to the end of the 2020/21 season with OFI in 11th place.

Greece Under-21 national team
On 26 May 2021, Simos was appointed manager of the Greece Under-21 national team, with whom he would finish third behind Portugal and Iceland in qualification for the 2023 UEFA European Under-21 Championship.

Athens Kallithea
On 30 November 2022, Simos was appointed manager of Athens Kallithea FC.

Managerial statistics

References

External links
Georgios Simos at The Guardian Football

1978 births
Living people
Greek footballers
Panathinaikos F.C. players
Agios Nikolaos F.C. players
OFI Crete F.C. players
Chalkidona F.C. players
Athlitiki Enosi Larissa F.C. players
AEK Larnaca FC players
Ionikos F.C. players
Panetolikos F.C. players
Ethnikos Piraeus F.C. players
Kallithea F.C. players
Super League Greece players
Cypriot First Division players
Greek expatriate footballers
Expatriate footballers in Cyprus
Greek expatriate sportspeople in Cyprus
Association football defenders
Greek football managers
Panathinaikos F.C. non-playing staff
AEK F.C. non-playing staff
OFI Crete F.C. managers
Super League Greece managers
People from Ioannina
Greek expatriate football managers